Shakil Ahmed (born 23 April 1994) is a Bangladeshi professional footballer who plays as a left-back in the Bangladesh Premier League for Sheikh Jamal DC.

Club career
On 21 August 2021, Shakil along with Sheikh Jamal DC teammate Faisal Ahmed physically attacked Brothers Union fans and ballboy's during a 2020–21 Bangladesh Premier League encounter. On 27 August, the Bangladesh Football Federation banned Shakil and Faisal for one match, while Sheikh Jamal DC were fined 1 lakh taka.

International career
On 18 March 2016, Shakil made his international debut against UAE.

Shakil was called up to the Bangladesh national football team for the 2018 FIFA World Cup qualification – AFC Second Round. On 24 March 2016, he played his only match in the qualifiers against Jordan.

References

External links 
 

Living people
1994 births
Footballers from Dhaka
Abahani Limited (Dhaka) players
Saif SC players
Rahmatganj MFS players
Sheikh Jamal Dhanmondi Club players
Bangladesh Football Premier League players
Bangladeshi footballers
Bangladesh international footballers
Bangladesh youth international footballers
Association football defenders